The House of Dragoș, also known as the House of Drăgoșești, was founded by Dragoș (also known as Dragoș Vodă or Dragoș of Bedeu), who was traditionally considered the first ruler or prince of Moldavia and who was Voivode in Maramureș.

Notable members
Dragoș, Voivode of Moldavia
Sas of Moldavia
Giula of Giulești
Balc of Moldavia
Drág, Count of the Székelys
Bartolomeu Dragfi (Bertalan Drágffy)
John Drágfi
Gáspár Drágffy (1506-1545), főispán of Közép-Szolnok.
Anna Drágffy (1522-1527), spouse of  Kristóf Frangepán / Frankopan (†1527), Ban of Croatia.
Julianna Drágffy (1498-1500), spouse of András Báthori de Ecsed, Master of the cavalry (Lovászmester), főispán of Szabolcs et Szatmár.

Coat of arms and history
Voivode Dragoş I de Bedő voivode of Máramaros Prince of Moldavia and his successor son Szász de Béltek Prince of Moldavia, bore the blue (azure) escutcheon with the gold crescent, gold stars and gold arrow on their coat of arms. Other notable scions of Dragoş I were Bartolomeu Drágfi of Béltek, Comes Perpetuus of Közép-Szolnok County (1479–1488), Voivode of Transylvania and Comes of the Székely people (1493–1499), who had distinguished himself earlier as a royal knight of the Hungarian Royal Court defeating the Ottoman Turks at the Battle of Breadfield (1479) together with Pál Kinizsi, István Báthory, Vuk Branković and Basarab Laiotă cel Bătrân. At the time of King Matthias Corvinus' death, Bartholomew Drágfi of Béltek was among the wealthiest landowners of the country, three castles, two manor houses, eight market towns and about 200 villages were in his property. His estates in Közép-Szolnok and Szatmár counties included the castles of Kővár and Erdőd together with the large lordships surrounding them, and further, the castles of Sólyom and the castellum of Csehi. Another important family member, among others, was John Drágfi of Béltek Comes of Temes County in 1525, who died 1526 in the Battle of Mohács.

See also
List of titled noble families in the Kingdom of Hungary

References

Sources

 
Romanian noble families
Rulers of Moldavia